Ushite Peak ( / ‘Ears Peak’) is a peak rising to  in northern Vitosha Mountain, Bulgaria.  The peak is situated on the northern border of Torfeno Branishte Nature Reserve, and 650 m south of Kamen Del Peak.  A small refuge is situated on the northeastern slopes Ushite, off track between Aleko and Zlatnite Mostove, the two most popular tourist sites on Vitosha.

See also

 Kamen Del
 Vitosha

External links
 Image Gallery of Peak Ushite

References
 Summit Post: Vitosha.
 Vitosha Nature Park. Website.
 Zone Bulgaria: Vitosha.
 Vitosha Map.

Vitosha
Mountains of Bulgaria
Landforms of Sofia City Province